Allan Passman (May 5, 1923 – June 30, 1984) was a Canadian football player who played for the Winnipeg Blue Bombers and Calgary Stampeders. He played college football the University of Manitoba. He died in 1984 in Pennsylvania.

References

1923 births
1984 deaths
Canadian football tackles
Manitoba Bisons football players
Winnipeg Blue Bombers players
Calgary Stampeders players